Armitt may refer to:

People with the surname
Annie Armitt (1850–1933), British author
Charles Armitt (1926—2004), British rugby player
John Armitt (born 1946), English civil engineer
John Armitt (wrestler) (1925–2008), New Zealand wrestler
Mary Louisa Armitt (1851–1911), British polymath, ornithologist, and founder of the Armitt Library
Sophia Armitt (1847–1908)m British teacher, writer, and naturalist.
Thomas Armitt (1904—1965), English rugby footballer

Other uses
Armitt Library, British museum and library